Galeandra bicarinata is a species of orchid native to Cuba and Florida. It is closely related to G. beyrichii (widespread throughout much of South America and the Caribbean) and regarded as part of that taxon until described as a distinct species in 2000.

References

External links
Institute for Regional Conservation, Floristic Inventory of South Florida Database Online, Galeandra bicarinata G.A. Romero & P.M. Br. Two-keeled hooded orchid, Helmet orchid
Roger l. Hammer's Everglades Wildflowers, Fairchild Tropical Botanical Garden Virtual Herbarium, Galeandra bicarinata

bicarinata
Orchids of Florida
Flora of Cuba
Plants described in 2000
Flora without expected TNC conservation status